The Fuling Stadium is a multi-purpose stadium in Chongqing, China.  It is currently used mostly for football matches.  The stadium holds 22,000 spectators.

References

Football venues in Chongqing
Multi-purpose stadiums in China
Sports venues in Chongqing